Al-Bahri Sport Club is an Iraqi football team based in Al-Jubaila, Basra, arrived twice to the semi-final in Iraq FA Cup. In 1990, the Iraqi Defense Ministry dissolved the club within its decision to dissolve all Iraqi military clubs, the club was playing in the Iraqi Premier League, then it was reconstituted.

History
Al-Bahri were founded in 1976, and in only their second season in existence, they reached the semifinals of the 1977–78 Iraq FA Cup, beating the reigning champions at the time (Al-Zawra'a) on the way, however they withdrew from the semifinal and handed their opponents Al-Tayaran a 3–0 victory. The following season, they won the Iraq Division One and were promoted into the 1979–80 Iraqi National League. However, they failed to win a single match, drawing four games and losing a huge 18 matches, finishing bottom of the league and being relegated back into the lower division.

They returned to the Iraqi Premier League in the 1986–87 season by finishing in the top two of a ten-team relegation/promotion playoff. They finished eighth out of 12 teams in the league, successfully avoiding relegation for the first time in their history. In the 1987–88 Iraqi National League, Al-Bahri finished 11th out of 16 teams, and in 1988–89, they were one of the ten teams to reach the final round, eventually finishing in the top six of the league. In 1989–90, Al-Bahri finished 11th out of 14 teams. Their spell in the Iraqi Premier League would come to an end when halfway through the 1990–91 season, the Iraqi Defense Ministry dissolved the club within its decision to dissolve all Iraqi military clubs.

The club was reconstituted for the following season but never managed to make it back into the Iraqi Premier League until the 2016–17 season when they finished as runners-up in the 2015–16 Iraq Division One, which was enough to secure promotion.

Current squad

First-team squad

Current technical staff

{| class="toccolours"
!bgcolor=silver|Position
!bgcolor=silver|Name
!bgcolor=silver|Nationality
|- bgcolor=#eeeeee
|Manager:||Asaad Abdul Razzaq||
|- 
|Assistant manager:||Ihsan Hadi Salih||
|- bgcolor=#eeeeee
|Goalkeeping coach:||Aqeel Abdul-Moshin||
|- 
| Administrative director:||Hamed Shather||
|-bgcolor=#eeeeee
| Club doctor:||Saad Abdullah||
|-

Managerial history
  Abdul Yemma Warwar 
  Nasser Talla Dahilan 
  Saad Hafidh  
  Abdul Yemma Warwar 
  Asaad Abdul Razzaq  
  Ahmed Rahim

Honours
Iraq Division One
Winner (2): 1978–79, 1985–86

Other games

Volleyball  
The Al-Bahri volleyball team won the Iraqi volleyball League title in the 2006–07 and 2010–11 seasons. The team also participated in the AVC Club Volleyball Championship and Arab Clubs Championship as a representative of Iraq.

The U-20 volleyball team won the Iraqi volleyball League U-20 title in the 2015–16 season.

References

External links
 Al-Bahri SC at Goalzz.com
 Iraq Clubs- Foundation Dates
 Basra Clubs Union

Football clubs in Iraq
1976 establishments in Iraq
Association football clubs established in 1976
Football clubs in Basra
Basra
Military association football clubs